Karamay is a prefecture-level city of Xinjiang.

Karamay may also refer to:

 Karamay District, a district of Karamay City
 Karamay (film), a 2010 documentary film